(born October 18, 1954) is a Japanese actor, voice actor, director of audiography, voice director and sound supervisor from Toyohashi, Aichi Prefecture who is affiliated with Combination. He graduated from Meiji University.

He is best known for his roles in The Lion King as Timon, Touch as Tatsuya Uesugi, Combattler V as Hyōma Aoi, Kiteretsu Daihyakka as Kōji Togari, Saint Seiya as Virgo Shaka and the TV Asahi version of the Japanese dub of the Back to the Future trilogy as Marty McFly.

Mitsuya came out as gay on a TV show on January 12, 2017. In January 2022, Mitsuya was diagnosed with prostate cancer.

Filmography

Television animation 
Candy Candy (1976) as Archibald "Archie" Cornwell
Combattler V (1976) (Hyoma Aoi)
Captain Tsubasa (1983) (Shun Nitta)
Georgie! (1983) (Royal)
Nanako SOS (1983) (Tomoshige Yotsuya)
Serendipity the Pink Dragon (1983) (Pira Pira)
Choriki Robo Galatt (1984) (Saradaayu)
Glass no Kamen (1984 TV series) (1984) (Sakurakouji Yuu)
Touch (1985) (Tatsuya Uesugi)
Saint Seiya (1986) (Virgo Shaka)
Saint Seiya (1988) (Benetnasch Eta Mime)
Hiatari Ryōkō! (1987) (Yūsaku Takasugi)
Anpanman (1988) (Katsudonman), (Hamburger Kid)
Dragon Ball Z (1989) (Kaio-shin, Gregory)
Ranma ½ (1989) (Ono Tofu-sensei)
Time Travel Tondekeman (1989) (Hayato Shindou)
Akazukin Chacha (1994) (Sorges, Yordas, Haideyans)
Nurse Angel Ririka SOS (1995) (Kurumi Moriya)
PaRapper the Rapper (2001) (Hairdresser Octopus)
Stitch! (2008) (Pleakley)
Kuchu Buranko (2009) (Young Irabu Ichiro)
Nichijou (2011) (Clay in episode 19)
Toriko (2011) (Grinpatch)
Gon (2012) (Choro)
Smile PreCure! (2012) (Joker)
Space Dandy (2014) (CEO in episode 20)
One Piece (2015) (Pica)
Saint Seiya: Soul of Gold (2015) (Virgo Shaka)
Junji Ito Collection (2018) (Souichi Tsujii) 
Pop Team Epic (2018) (Popuko (Episode 1-B))

Unknown date
Ojarumaru (Captain Silver)
Sasuga no Sarutobi (Sarutobi Nikumaru)

OVA
Megazone 23 (1985) (Mōri)
Majo demo Steady (1986) (Hisashi Seki)
Legend of the Galactic Heroes (1988) (Heinrich Von Kümmel)
Space Family Carlvinson (1988) (Andy)
Vampire Princess Miyu (1988) (Lemures)
Starship Troopers (1988) (Carl)
Fairy King (1988) (Jack Oshinumi/Gwyn)
The Enemy's the Pirates! (1989) (Apulo)
Devil Hunter Yohko (1990) (Madoka Mano)

Theatrical animation
Candy Candy – Candy no Natsu Yasumi (1978)
Natsu e no Tobira (1981) (Claude)
Godmars (1982) (Marg)
Doraemon: Nobita and the Castle of the Undersea Devil (1983) (Underwater Buggy)
Doraemon: Nobita's Little Star Wars (1985) (LocoRoco)
Doraemon: Nobita and the Steel Troops (1986) (Micros)
Touch: Sebangou no Nai Ace (1986) (Tatsuya Uesugi)
Touch 2: Sayounara no Okurimono (1986) (Tatsuya Uesugi)
Bug-tte Honey: Megaromu Shojo Ma 4622 (1987) (Wannappu)
Saint Seiya: Evil Goddess Eris (1987) (Lyra Orpheus)
Touch 3: Don't Pass Me By (1987) (Tatsuya Uesugi)
Doraemon: The Record of Nobita's Parallel Visit to the West (1988) (Time Machine)
Hiatari Ryoko! Yume no Naka ni Kimi ga Ita (1988) (Yūsaku Takasugi)
Doraemon: Nobita and the Birth of Japan (1989) (Time Machine)
Anpanman: Baikinman's Counterattack (1990) (Hamburger Kid), (Katsudonman)
Magical Taluluto (1991) (Tabashiba)
Yu Yu Hakusho The Movie: Poltergeist Report (1994) (Majari)
Sakura Wars: The Movie (2001) (Musei Edogawa)
Anpanman: Gomira's Star (2001) (Katsudonman)
Anpanman: Dolly of the Star of Life (2006) (Katsudonman)
Anpanman: Kokin-chan and the Blue Tears (2006) (Katsudonman)
Anpanman: Purun of the Bubble Ball (2007) (Katsudonman)
Anpanman: Rinrin the Fairy's Secret (2008) (Katsudonman)
Dragon Ball Z: Battle of Gods (2013) (Kibito Kaioushin)
Toriko the Movie: Bishokushin's Special Menu (2013) (Grinpatch)
Soreike! Anpanman: Ringo Bō Ya To Min'Nano Negai (2014) (Hamburger Kid)
Crayon Shin-chan: Crash! Graffiti Kingdom and Almost Four Heroes (2020) (Wizard)

Video games
Brave Fencer Musashi (1998) (Rādo)
Sakura Wars 3: Is Paris Burning? (2001) (Masque De Corbeau)
Kingdom Hearts (video games) (2002) (Doctor Finklestein)
Kingdom Hearts II (2005) (Doctor Finklestein, Timon)
Sakura Wars 3: Is Paris Burning? (2001) (Masque De Corbeau)
Super Robot Taisen (????) (Aoi Hyouma)
Dragon Quest Heroes II (2016)
Persona 5 (2016) (Suguru Kamoshida)
Xenoblade Chronicles 2 (2017) (Muimui)
League of Legends (Shaco)(Viego)

Live-Action TV Drama
X-Bomber (1980) (PP Adamsky)
Kaitou Sentai Lupinranger VS Keisatsu Sentai Patranger (2018) (GoodStriker (eps 2 - 13, 15 - 51))

Live-Action film
Kamen Rider × Kamen Rider Wizard & Fourze: Movie War Ultimatum (2012) (Gahra)
 Kaitou Sentai Lupinranger VS Keisatsu Sentai Patranger en Film (2018) (GoodStriker)

Dubbing roles

Live-action
Michael J. Fox
Back to the Future (TV Asahi edition) (Marty McFly)
Back to the Future Part II (TV Asahi edition) (Marty McFly Senior, Marty McFly Junior, Marlene McFly)
Back to the Future Part III (TV Asahi and TV Nippon editions) (Marty McFly, Seamus McFly)
The Frighteners (Frank Bannister)
Stuart Little (TV edition) (Stuart Little)
Amadeus (Wolfgang Amadeus Mozart (Tom Hulce))
American Graffiti (1984 TBS edition) (Terry "The Toad" Fields (Charles Martin Smith))
The Blue Lagoon (1983 TBS edition) (Richard Lestrange (Christopher Atkins))
The Bonfire of the Vanities (Sherman McCoy (Tom Hanks))
The Cat in the Hat (The Fish (Sean Hayes))
The Empire Strikes Back (1980 Movie theater edition) (Dak Ralter (John Morton))
Family Business (Adam McMullen (Matthew Broderick))
The Fifth Element (Blu-ray and 2002 TV Asahi edition) (Ruby Rhod (Chris Tucker))
Flight of the Phoenix (Elliott (Giovanni Ribisi))
Fraggle Rock (NHK version) (Wembley Fraggle (Steve Whitmire)) 
Full House (Steve Urkel (Jaleel White))
Garfield: The Movie (Louis (Nick Cannon))
Good Morning, Vietnam (Lt. Steven Hauk (Bruno Kirby))
Joe's Apartment (Ralph Roach)
Little Shop of Horrors (Seymour Krelbourn (Rick Moranis))
Men in Black 3 (Griffin (Michael Stuhlbarg))
Moms' Night Out (Sean (Sean Astin))
Mouse Hunt (Lars Smuntz (Lee Pace))
Pacific Rim (Dr. Hermann Gottlieb (Burn Gorman))
Pacific Rim: Uprising (Dr. Hermann Gottlieb (Burn Gorman))
Project A (Tai Po)
Riptide (Murray 'Boz' Bozinsky (Thom Bray))
Short Circuit (Johnny 5)
Small Soldiers (Insaniac)
Soap (Jodie Dallas (Billy Crystal))
West Side Story (1979 TBS edition) (Baby John (Eliot Feld))
Will & Grace (Jack McFarland (Sean Hayes))
xXx (Agent Toby Lee Shavers (Michael Roof))

Animation
The Adventures of Tintin (1989 Nikkatsu edition) (Tintin)
Hotel Transylvania (Murray)
The Land Before Time (Petrie)
Lilo & Stitch (Pleakley)
Lilo & Stitch: The Series (Pleakley)
The Lion Guard (Timon)
The Lion King (Timon)
The Lion King II: Simba's Pride (Timon)
The Lion King 1½ (Timon)
Timon and Pumbaa (Timon)
Looney Tunes (Speedy Gonzales)
The Looney Tunes Show (Speedy Gonzales)
The Nightmare Before Christmas (Doctor Finklestein)
Oliver & Company (Tito)
Robots (Tim the Gate Guard)
Space Jam: A New Legacy (Speedy Gonzales)
Star Wars: The Clone Wars (Jar Jar Binks)
Thumbelina (Miss Fieldmouse)
Toy Story series (Rex)
Monsters, Inc. (Mike Wazowski, teaser)

Japanese voice-over
Star Tours (Captain Rex)
Star Tours—The Adventures Continue (Captain Rex)
Peter Pan's Flight (Tick-Tock the Crocodile)

References

External links
Official blog 

Living people
Aoni Production voice actors
Japanese gay actors
Japanese male child actors
Japanese male singers
Japanese male video game actors
Japanese male voice actors
Japanese LGBT actors
Male voice actors from Aichi Prefecture
Meiji University alumni
People from Toyohashi
Japanese voice directors
20th-century Japanese male actors
21st-century Japanese male actors
1954 births